Mahatma Gandhi International School may refer to:
 Mahatma Gandhi International School, Ahmedabad, India
 Mahatma Gandhi International School, Pasay, Philippines

See also
 Mahatma Gandhi School (disambiguation)